Meendum Vazhven is 1971 Tamil-language thriller film, directed by T. N. Balu and produced by V. C. Jain and G. C. Lal Vani. The film's script was written by T. N. Balu. Music was by M. S. Viswanathan. The film stars Ravichandran, Bharathi, Nagesh, R. S. Manohar and Vijaya Lalitha playing lead, with Major Sundararajan, S. Varalakshmi, Thengai Srinivasan and Master Sekhar playing supporting roles.

Plot 
Jagatheesh (R. S. Manohar) wants to grab the properties of his businessman paternal uncle, Rajamanickam Pillai, by killing him and his young son Babu, (Master Sekhar) who  is studying in a distant boarding school. Knowing his evil intention, the paternal uncle keeps his son's whereabouts a secret which is known only to his loyal personal secretary Shanthi (Bharathi). One night after a bitter argument over the properties, Jagatheesh kills his uncle and abducts his secretary Shanthi to find out about his young son Babu.

Meanwhile, Raju (Ravichandran, son of a rich man Chinna Durai (Major Sundararajan) is thrown out of his house by his stepmother Shantha Lakshmi (S. Varalakshmi) and lands in the city as a taxi driver. The secretary Shanthi gets abducted in his taxi, the news is in the newspapers and the police start looking for the taxi. Raju then goes after Jagathesh and finds Shanthi locked up in a cell on a remote island. Jagatheesh finds out the whereabouts of the boy but is unable to identify him, so he abducts a busload of boys from that school and forces Shanthi to identify the boy so that he could kill him. Raju,  with help of a small-time magician Chithambaram (Nagesh), rescues Shanthi and the boys after a series of fights with the gangsters. Raju and Shanthi get married.

Cast 
 Ravichandran as Raju
 Bharathi as Shanthi
 Nagesh as Chithambaram, Raju's friend/Magician
 R. S. Manohar as Jagadesh, Babu's Paternal Father
 Vijaya Lalitha as Lalitha, Jagatheesh's lover
 Major Sundararajan as Chella Durai, Raju and Rathnam's father
 S. Varalakshmi as Shantha Lakshmi, Rathnam's mother
 Thengai Srinivasan as Black Cat, Jagatheesh's Hitman
 V. Gopalakrishnan as Rathnam, Raju's half brother
 Master Sekhar as Babu
Samikkannu as Constable Irudhaya Raj
 MCT. Muthaiah
 Singapore Sundaram
 K. S. Angamuthu
 Jayakumari as dumb woman dancer
 Yasotha
 Malathi
 Surekha
 Syamala
 Jai Vijaya

Soundtrack 

Music was composed by M. S. Viswanathan, with lyrics by Kannadasan. The playback singers consists of Jikki L. R. Eswari A. L. Raghavan S. P. Balasubrahmanyam L. R. Anjali and Pushpalatha.

References

External links 

1971 films
1970s Tamil-language films
1970s spy thriller films
1970s thriller drama films
Films set in 1971
1970s crime thriller films
Films scored by M. S. Viswanathan
Indian crime thriller films
Indian spy thriller films
Indian thriller drama films
Fictional portrayals of the Tamil Nadu Police
1971 drama films